The 12 Tasks of Imelda is a Canadian comedy-drama feature film, written, produced and directed by Martin Villeneuve and released in 2022. Based on the last twelve years of Villeneuve’s paternal grandmother Mélenda “Imelda” Turcotte-Villeneuve's life, the movie stars the filmmaker as Imelda, an elderly widow on a quest to settle unresolved scores and finish out her bucket list as she approaches age 100.

The film expands on a series of short films Villeneuve previously made starring the character. Three chapters in the series — Imelda (2014), Imelda 2: le notaire (2020) and Imelda 3: Simone (2020) — were released as standalone short films, constituting the “Imelda Trilogy”; several further short films featuring the character have been made but not yet released.

Its cast also includes Robert Lepage, Ginette Reno, Michel Barrette, Anne-Marie Cadieux, Antoine Bertrand, Yves Jacques, Lynda Beaulieu and Marc-François Blondin. Due to Martin Villeneuve’s difficulty in securing funding to produce the feature version, all of the cast and crew, who had already taken part in the short films, worked on the feature film as unpaid volunteers.

The film premiered on September 9, 2022 at the Quebec City Film Festival, before going into commercial release in 29 theaters across Quebec on October 28, 2022. It was also screened at the 2022 Whistler Film Festival, where Arthur Tarnowski won the award for Best Editing in a Borsos Competition film.

References

External links
 
 The 12 Tasks of Imelda – Trailer with English subtitles on Vimeo
 THE 12 TASKS OF IMELDA on BULB
 The 12 Tasks of Imelda on Maison 4:3 site

2022 films
2022 comedy-drama films
Canadian comedy-drama films
Quebec films
French-language Canadian films
2020s Canadian films